Eidfjord Church is a parish church of the Church of Norway in Eidfjord Municipality in Vestland county, Norway. It is located in the village of Eidfjord. It is the church for the Eidfjord parish which is part of the Hardanger og Voss prosti (deanery) in the Diocese of Bjørgvin. The modern-looking red brick church was built in a rectangular design in 1981 using plans drawn up by the architect Sigurd Sekse. The church seats about 375 people.

History
The Old Eidfjord Church was used for over 700 years by the people of Eidfjord before being replaced with a new church. By the 1970s, the parish decided to build a new church. Sigurd Sekse was hired to design the new building. Construction began in 1979 and it was completed in stages. The final stage of the new building was completed in early 1981. The new church was consecrated on 31 May 1981. The brick church building has an almost square floor plan and a sloping, pyramid-shaped roof. After this new church was completed, the old church was no longer used for regular services, but it is still used on special occasions.

See also
List of churches in Bjørgvin

References

Eidfjord
Churches in Vestland
Brick churches in Norway
Rectangular churches in Norway
20th-century Church of Norway church buildings
Churches completed in 1981
1981 establishments in Norway